Chuck Biscuits (born Charles Montgomery on April 17, 1965) is a Canadian drummer best known for his work in several punk rock bands.

Biscuits was a member of D.O.A. from 1978 to 1982, playing on the band's first two albums before briefly joining Black Flag and later Circle Jerks. He later joined Danzig in 1987, playing on the band's first four albums as well as their first EP before leaving in 1994. Most recently, he played in Social Distortion from 1996 to 1999.

Career
Biscuits has named his main influences as John Bonham, Rat Scabies of the Damned, Topper Headon of the Clash, Keith Moon and Stewart Copeland.

Biscuits is the brother of Ken "Dimwit" Montgomery, a fixture on the Vancouver music scene—at different times, both brothers played drums for D.O.A. Biscuits joined Black Flag in 1982 and toured with them for five months. His only studio recordings for the band were the 1982 demos for the My War album, which have been widely bootlegged.

After Black Flag, he played with the short-lived Floorlords. When that band broke up, Biscuits planned to quit the music business and took courses in art and electrical engineering. He briefly filled in on drums for a few shows for the Red Hot Chili Peppers during their Freaky Styley tour in 1986. A year later, producer Rick Rubin invited Biscuits to become the drummer for Danzig. Biscuits had been vocalist/songwriter Glenn Danzig's first choice as drummer for his band.

Biscuits joined Danzig in 1987 and appeared on the band's first four albums and one EP. In 1990 he recorded drums for one track on Glenn Danzig's final album with the band Samhain. In 1994 he became the first member of the original Danzig line-up to leave the band, citing a contract dispute as the reason for his departure.

Biscuits participated in a special concert held on December 28, 1994 to honour the lifetime achievements of his brother Ken, who had died earlier in the year of a drug overdose.

On October 27, 2009, a blogger named James Greene Jr. who claimed to have been in recent contact with Biscuits posted a report on his blog announcing that the drummer had died on October 24 of throat cancer. This report quickly circulated to multiple media sources, but was soon questioned by Biscuits' friends and family as a hoax. That evening, Biscuit's sister-in-law e-mailed Greene to confirm that the musician was still alive. Biscuits himself never released a statement concerning the death hoax, and Greene would later argue that Biscuits was entirely responsible for the false report.

Equipment
Biscuits used Pro-Mark DC-10 marching sticks to drum. His drumkit at the beginning of Danzig was a black Premier Resonator, though he switched to a chrome covered 1970s era Ludwig Classic maple kit for Danzig II, and continued with that kit to record and tour for Danzig III and Danzig IV. Biscuits was usually seen using Zildjian cymbals. His regular ride cymbal sound during his work with Danzig was a Zildjian 22" Earth Ride. Biscuits also favored Paiste Rude cymbals. He used medium and rock ride cymbals as crashes. Biscuits' mainstay snare with Danzig was a Sonor steel model, though he also used a Ludwig piccolo snare.

With D.O.A. and Black Flag, Biscuits used an older blonde maple Slingerland kit and was also photographed using various colored Ludwig drums. For Social Distortion, Biscuits used a Boom Theory kit, including a Bridgedeck snare built by Al Adinolfi.

Discography

D.O.A. (1978–1982)

 Disco Sucks
 The Prisoner
 Triumph of the Ignoroids
 World War III
 Vancouver Complication
 Something Better Change
 Hardcore '81
 Let Them Eat Jellybeans
 Positively D.O.A. (No God, No Country, No Lies)
 Rat Music for Rat People Vol. 1
 Bloodied But Unbowed
 War on 45 (partial)
 1978 (2019 2-LP single CD compilation featuring rare Biscuits performances)

Black Flag (1982)

 1982: The Complete 1982 Demos Plus More (bootleg album)
 2010: Live at the On Broadway 1982 (live album)

Circle Jerks (1983–1984) 
 Repo Man soundtrack
 The Best of Flipside Video

Floorlords (1986) 

 Black Ice Ride 2-Nite

Glenn Danzig and the Power and Fury Orchestra

 1987: Less than Zero soundtrack

Danzig (1987–1994) 

 1988: Danzig
 1990: Danzig II: Lucifuge
 1992: Danzig III: How the Gods Kill
 1993: Thrall-Demonsweatlive
 1994: Danzig 4
 2001: Live on the Black Hand Side
 2007: The Lost Tracks of Danzig

Run-D.M.C.

 1988: Tougher Than Leather (drum tracks only)

Samhain

 1990: Final Descent

Social Distortion (1996–1999) 

 1998: Live at the Roxy

References

External links
Biography from Misfits Central

1965 births
Living people
American punk rock drummers
American male drummers
Black Flag (band) members
Place of birth missing (living people)
Hardcore punk musicians
Social Distortion members
Fear (band) members
Circle Jerks members
Danzig (band) members
Horror punk musicians
Samhain (band) members
20th-century American drummers
D.O.A. (band) members